Governor Woodford may refer to:

Alexander George Woodford (1782–1870), Governor of Gibraltar from 1836 to 1842
Ralph Woodford (1784–1828), Governor of Trinidad from 1813 to 1828